"Cornelia Street" is a song written and recorded by American singer-songwriter Taylor Swift, taken from her seventh studio album Lover, which was released on August 23, 2019, through Republic Records. Swift produced the song with Jack Antonoff. The title of the song refers to a street in the New York neighborhood Greenwich Village, where Swift had rented a townhouse.

Swift stated that "Cornelia Street" was one of the most personal songs on Lover. The song's lyrics are about Swift pleading to never let her love interest go, after having shared the ups and downs during the course of their relationship. The electropop song is instrumented by a flute-like keyboard line, a delicate piano, and a fluttering synthesizer.

Music critics lauded Swift's narrative lyricism in "Cornelia Street" and its sentimental production, with some picking it as an album highlight. The song was included in Uproxx list of the best songs of 2019. Upon the parent album's release, "Cornelia Street" entered and peaked on the singles chart of Australia (number 40), the Canadian Hot 100 (number 51), and the US Billboard Hot 100 (number 57). A live version of the song, recorded at the City of Lover concert in Paris in September 2019, was released on digital platforms on May 18, 2020.

Background
Taylor Swift released her seventh studio album, Lover, on August 23, 2019, through Republic Records. Described by Swift as a "love letter to love itself", Lover explores the "full spectrum of love", inspired by the connections she felt with her fans during her Reputation Stadium Tour (2018). The track list of Lover consists of 18 songs, of which three were solely written by Swift: "Lover", "Cornelia Street", and "Daylight". All three songs were produced by Swift and Jack Antonoff.

In an interview with Entertainment Weekly, Swift said that "Cornelia Street" was one of the most personal songs on Lover that were "nearest to her heart". At the City of Lover concert in Paris in September 2019, Swift told her audience that she wrote it in the bathtub, "just for context". The title of "Cornelia Street" refers to a street in New York City's Greenwich Village neighborhood, where Swift had rented a townhouse for a short period of time. This is also referenced in the first verse, where Swift sings, "I rent a place on Cornelia Street," which Vulture revealed to be based on Swift's experience hiring the place while her Tribeca residence was being renovated.

Music and lyrics

Musically, "Cornelia Street" is a pop song instrumented by a keyboard line, pulsing synths in the background, and echoing vocals. The Daily Nebraskan described the song as electropop, and the keyboard line as "flute-like". At the bridge and prechorus, Swift's vocals are accompanied by a delicate piano line. The chorus features Swift singing in her falsetto vocal register. Lyrically, "Cornelia Street" explores contemplative themes of heartbreak and nostalgia. On Elvis Duran and the Morning Show, Swift explained: "It's about the things that took place and the memories that took place on that street... all the nostalgia. Sometimes we bond our memories to the places that they happen."

Critics observed that "Cornelia Street" stays true to Swift's narrative songwriting craftsmanship for exploring emotions with intricate details. To demonstrate this viewpoint, Carl Wilson of Slate selected the lyrics: "Windows swung right open, autumn air / Jacket 'round my shoulders is yours / We bless the rains on Cornelia Street / Memorize the creaks in the floor." Throughout the song, imagery of New York City are prevalent—although Swift and her love interest initially share happy moments together, Swift leaves the relationship without saying goodbye as soon as she worries whether her love interest was being honest. As she reaches a tunnel, however, her love interest calls and lures her in again. Years later, she is afraid that she might misstep again and lose him: "That's the kind of heartbreak time won't mend / I'd never walk Cornelia Street again." Wilson thought that the "We bless the rains on Cornelia Street" lyric was a reference to Toto's 1982 song "Africa", and the "tunnel" lyric refers to Lincoln Tunnel, while Mikael Wood of the Los Angeles Times interpreted it as Holland Tunnel.

Vogue compared the song's narrative to that of "All Too Well", a song on Swift's 2012 album Red, for featuring the "same mix of nostalgia for streets crossed together, turning seasons, and relationship highs that make the lows hurt that much more." In a review for Rolling Stone, Rob Sheffield deemed "Cornelia Street" a progression from "Holy Ground", a song also from Red. Both songs depict a girl in New York City, which reminds her of her love interest even before the relationship is over. If "Holy Ground" depicts a relationship that ended in the "usual way", however, "Cornelia Street" is about Swift clinging onto a relationship, pleading not to make the same mistake again.

Critical reception
In publications' reviews of Lover, critics praised "Cornelia Street" for showcasing Swift's songwriting abilities, and some picked it as an album highlight. Writing for The Music, Keira Leonard complimented the personal lyrics and Swift's vocals on delicate piano tunes, which offered "every ounce of emotion". Ben Rayner of The Toronto Star felt that the song exemplified Swift's "real-girl relatability" that shaped her public image and artistry. Although the song initially comes off as generic "21st-century pop", its progression, especially at the bridge where Swift sings "I hope I never lose you" over a delicate piano line, offers emotional engagement. On behalf of Time, Raisa Bruner complimented the song for representing Swift's songwriting abilities, and described the lyrics "I hope I never lose you, hope it never ends / I'd never walk Cornelia Street again" as "a punch of relatability".

Vogue Jenna Adrian-Diaz observed that the song reflected Swift's personal life at the time, as she was no longer associated with on-and-off relationships that served as an inspiration for her songwriting, but instead retreated her love life from the public eye. Carl Wilson from Slate described the song as the album's best, praising the lyrics for featuring intricate details and showcasing Swift's new perspective on love. Wilson also praised the production for evoking "mixed emotions". Sheffield selected the song as one of the proofs for Swift's songwriting maturity, as she focused on "being in love" rather than failed relationships, which had been a recurring theme. Anna Gaca from Pitchfork lauded the song for offering a contemplative moment: "a lovely, understated tribute to memory and nostalgia with the power to make one rarefied block of Manhattan feel universal".

In a similar sentiment, Vox Alex Abad-Santos picked "Cornelia Street" as Lover best song for its relatable lyrics with universal emotions, despite utilizing personal details. Abad-Santos also regarded the song as an extension of Swift's songwriting showcased on "Style" (from Swift's 2014 album 1989) for offering "a sudden, devastating wistfulness for a place or feeling you've never known". Jon Caramanica of The New York Times commented that "Cornelia Street" captures the album's "power". He felt that the song's "atmospheric gloom" was a contrast from Lover overall bright tunes, and more in line with the production of Swift's 2017 album Reputation, and praised the lyrics for portraying Swift as "coy and lost in reverie". Consequence of Sound similarly considered the song "less cheerful and optimistic" than the overall theme of Lover, and compared it to "New Year's Day", a song off Reputation. Uproxx ranked "Cornelia Street" at number seven on their list of the best songs of 2019, praising Swift's songwriting for offering emotional engagement with "a crafty melody and gentle hand".

Live performance
Swift first performed the song at the City of Lover one-off concert at the Olympia on September 9, 2019, in Paris, France. Swift performed a stripped-down version of the song, backing herself on an acoustic guitar. The concert was filmed and later aired as a TV special on American Broadcasting Company (ABC) on May 17, 2020. The performance of "Cornelia Street" was released for digital download and streaming on May 18, 2020.

Credits and personnel
Credits and personnel are adapted from the liner notes of Lover.

 Taylor Swift – vocals, songwriter, producer
 Jack Antonoff – producer, programming, live drums, keyboards, piano, recording
 Laura Sisk – recording
 John Rooney – recording assistant
 John Hanes – engineer, engineer for mix
 Serban Ghenea – mixing
 Randy Merrill – mastering

Charts
Upon the release of Lover, "Cornelia Street" entered the official singles charts in Australia (ARIA Singles Chart), Canada (Canadian Hot 100), and the United States (Billboard Hot 100). It also entered the UK Streaming Chart, a component chart of the official UK Singles Chart.

Release history

References

External links

2019 songs
Electropop songs
Taylor Swift songs
Songs written by Taylor Swift
Song recordings produced by Taylor Swift
Song recordings produced by Jack Antonoff
Songs about New York City
Songs about streets